The Nicholas Building is a landmark historic office and retail building located at 37 Swanston St, at the intersection of Swanston Street and Flinders Lane, in the Melbourne central business district, Victoria, Australia. Designed by architect Harry Norris and completed in 1926, it is the grandest example in Melbourne of what is known as the 'Chicago School' or 'Commercial Palazzo' style, featuring large scale classical elements. It has long housed a range of small businesses, and is now known for its creative industry tenants such as fashion designers and artists and specialist retailers. It had the longest operating manual lifts in the city, and the ground floor Cathedral Arcade is one of the most notable arcades in the city.

While the building structure itself is protected, it does not prevent the change of its use. The building was placed on the market in June 2021. This has led the Nicholas Building Association to campaign to raise funds in order to rescue the current use of the building as a creative hub from commercial development. 

As a result, some artists in the community have raised awareness that the lack of protection for the use of buildings can have adverse effects in protecting heritage:"However, usage is rarely safeguarded - heritage protection is mainly concerned about the look of a building. And mainly concerned about how it looks from the street. Interiors are mostly disregarded unless there's some aspect about it that has gathered some public fame. In other words, heritage protection is superficial at best and fairly ineffective in protecting what is worth protecting. Safeguarding a city entails much more than protecting the 'decorative' features of a façade."

History
The Nicholas family, headed by Alfred Nicholas, built their fortune on the production of Aspro, a replacement for the German-made aspirin when it became unavailable during World War I. The Nicholas company never occupied the building; it was instead built as a speculative office building development. It was completed in 1926, and designed by architect Harry Norris. Norris established his architecture practice in the building, remaining until his retirement in the mid-fifties. From 1926 to 1967 a Coles department store occupied the basement and part of the ground floor. The building was home to businesses associated with the Flinders Lane garment trade, commercial artists, medical practitioners and architects. By the 2010s the small rooms and relatively cheap rent attracted creative industry practitioners and specialist retailers, some of whom still serve the fashion industry, and it became renowned as one of Melbourne's 'vertical lanes'.

The novel Shantaram, written by one of Australia's most wanted fugitives Gregory David Roberts, was written in the building. In 2003, a stencil, believed  by UK artist Banksy, was painted on the building, on the corner of Swanston Street and Flinders Lane. A piece of plastic was put up over the work to protect it from the elements but it was later painted over by city council workers, upsetting the art community.

Before undergoing modernisation in 2012, the Nicholas Building was home to the last manually operated lift in Melbourne.

The building is listed by the National Trust and on Heritage Victoria.

Architecture

The Nicholas Building was built in a time of imposed height restrictions that lasted from 1916 to 1957 and stated a limit of 132 ft (40.3 m). It consists of 10 floors and is influenced by the Chicago style evident in Melbourne at the time. It has a terracotta faience façade which was designed to self-clean; the grey terracotta manufactured as ‘Granitex’ by Wunderlich was used due to its durability and ease of maintenance. The exterior has a variety of Classical Revival features, such as giant order ionic pilasters to divide the upper façade into bays and Doric columns defining the lower section.

A steel frame structure was used for the first three floors with reinforced concrete on the upper floors. The offices above the first floor was planned around a light well, many now used as studio spaces.

In popular culture
The building is referenced in the song "Elevator Operator" on Australian musician Courtney Barnett's 2015 album Sometimes I Sit and Think, and Sometimes I Just Sit.

See also
 Cathedral Arcade
 Burnham Beeches
 Architecture of Melbourne

References

External links

Buildings and structures completed in 1926
Heritage-listed buildings in Melbourne
Harry Norris buildings
1926 establishments in Australia
Chicago school architecture in Australia
Buildings and structures in Melbourne City Centre